Ronald G. Wanek (born 1941) is an American billionaire businessman, and the founder and chairman of Ashley Furniture Industries.

Early life 
Wanek grew up on a dairy farm in Minnesota, where his grandfather and great uncle built furniture as a hobby.

Career 
Wanek started his first manufacturing business, Arcadia Furniture, in 1970 with a loan from his father and money he got from selling his home.

In 1976, Wanek purchased Ashley Furniture, a company that had been operating since the 1940s. After taking control of the company, Wanek established overseas manufacturing and distribution capabilities to make the business more competitive.

In 2012, Wanek, "a prominent Republican donor", gave $1 million towards hosting Tampa's Republican National Convention.

Personal life
He is married to Joyce; they have three children and live in St. Petersburg, Florida. His son Todd R. Wanek is the CEO of Ashley Furniture.

In 1998, Wanek and his wife Joyce started the Ronald & Joyce Wanek Foundation. The foundation donates to causes including children and families charities, medical research, education, arts and U.S. armed forces.

References

External links
 Furniture Hall Of Fame Inducts Ashley Founder Ron Wanek at RTO Online.

1941 births
American billionaires
Living people
Place of birth missing (living people)
20th-century American businesspeople